Chalari Narasimahacharya was an Indian Hindu scholar in the Dvaita Vedānta tradition. He is the follower of Uttaradi Math and the disciple of Satyanatha Tirtha.

Early life
Chalari Narasimahacharya was born in Chalari (reported to be village near Malkhed) into a family of scholars to Chalari Narayanacharya, who was the disciple of Satyanidhi Tirtha. The members of the Chalari family are evidently all disciples of Uttaradi Math.

Works
Chalari Narasimahacharya is a prolific writer and over 15 works are ascribed to him.

Tattva Sankhyana Tippani, a commentary on Tattva Sankhyana of Madhva
Isaupanishad bhashya, a commentary on Isaupanishad bhasya of Madhva
A commentary on Pramana Padhati
A commentary on Sadachara Smriti of Madhva
Commentaries on Shiva Stuti, Parijathapaharana and Sangraha Ramayana of Narayana Panditacharya
Brahmasutrarthadhikaranasamgraha, A commentary on Brahma Sutra Bhashya of Madhva
Brihattaratamya Stotra
Bhattojjidiksitakritikuttanam
A commentary on Bhagavata Tatparay Nirnaya of Madhva
A commentary on Rigbhashyatika of Jayatirtha
Smrityarthasagara
Sabdikakanthamani

References

Bibliography
 

Uttaradi Math
Scholars from Karnataka
Dvaitin philosophers
Year of birth missing
Year of death missing